Kjær is a surname of Danish origin, meaning carr or fen. The name is used in Denmark and Norway. It may refer to any of the following people:

Birthe Kjær (born 1948), Danish singer
Ejnar Martin Kjær (1893–1947), Danish politician 
Heidi Kjær, Danish cricketer
Henriette Kjær (born 1966), Danish politician
Kirsten Kjær (1893–1985), Danish painter
Nils Kjær (1870–1924), Norwegian playwright
 Peter Kjær (footballer) (born 1965), Danish footballer, television commentator and sporting director
 Peter Kjær (architect), rector of Umeå School of Architecture
Simon Kjær (born 1989), Danish footballer

Danish-language surnames